The Group 13 Rugby league Competition is a defunct New South Wales Country Rugby League group competition which was run under the auspices of the Club Rugby League. It was disbanded after the 1991 Season. It covered an area which was the Southern Part of New South Wales and even some parts of Northern Victoria.

Group 13 was originally called Group 18 between 1934 and 1936. The group was born from the Far South Rugby League and Wagga Rugby League.

The Far South Rugby League comprised Albury, Holbrook, Henty, Culcairn, Tumbarumba, The Rock and Yerong Creek whilst Wagga Rugby League comprised Wagga Magpies, Wagga Old Boys, Borambola, Farm and Militia.

Many towns and teams competed in Group 13 between 1934 and 1991. Four Grades were contested: First Grade, Reserve Grade, Under 18s and Under 16s. After the 1991 season, the remaining clubs joined the Group 9 Rugby League Competition or went into recess; many later ended up in the Victorian-administered Murray Cup.

Teams

First Grade Champions

Clayton Cup Winners 
Group 13 produced six teams that won the Clayton Cup (Country Rugby League) highest honour in Club Rugby League.

1939 –  Wagga Magpies

1940 –  Henty

1969 –  Tarcutta

1975 –  Albury Blues

1985 –  Tumbarumba

1986 –  Tumbarumba

References

Defunct rugby league competitions in New South Wales